The 1930 season was the nineteenth season for Santos FC.

References

External links
Official Site 

Santos
1930
1930 in Brazilian football